is a Japanese stage actress. Her first film role was as Oba in Female Convict Scorpion: Jailhouse 41. She is the narrator in the 1992 film of Stravinsky's opera-oratorio Oedipus Rex directed by Julie Taymor.

Filmography

Films

Television

Honours
Medal with Purple Ribbon (2005)
Order of the Rising Sun, 4th Class, Gold Rays with Rosette (2012)

References

External links

1941 births
Living people
Japanese film actresses
Recipients of the Medal with Purple Ribbon
Recipients of the Order of the Rising Sun, 4th class
Japanese television actresses
Japanese stage actresses
20th-century Japanese actresses
21st-century Japanese actresses
People from Minato
Actresses from Tokyo